Säläxetdin (Säläx) Atnağulof (Yaña imlâ سەلەختدىن ئانتاغولف, Jaꞑalif Sələxetdin Atnaƣulof), 1893 – 1938) was a politician, publicist and writer.

Biography 
Atnağulof was born in the village of Suıqkül (Sukkulovo). He received education in rural madrasa, in rural school and in Ğäliä madrasa.
After the February Revolution, he began to engage in political activities. In 1917 he was elected to Millät Mäclese, where he was a member of Tupraqçılar (or supporters of  territorial autonomy) faction and participated in the activities of its territorial autonomy commission. In 1918 he was a secretary of the Collegium for the implementation of the Idel-Ural State; at the same time, he was a chairman of Bashkir Central Council. During Russian Civil War was the chief editor of Tatar-language newspapers Qızıl yaw, Qızıl Armiä (Red Army). In 1921–1922 he was the chief editor of Eşçe (Worker) newspaper.

In 1920-1921 and since 1922 worked People's Commissariat of Education of Tatarstan ASSR, in 1927–1929 the head of Academic Center under aforementioned People's Commissariat; at the same time Atnağulof was the chief editor of Qızıl Tatarstan (Red Tatarstan) newspaper (1922–1924). During 1920s and 1930s he collaborated with many Tatar-language newspapers and journals: Yäş eşçe (Young Worker), Tamaşaçı (Spectator), Suğışçan Allasız (Militant Atheist), İgençelär (Farmers), etc.

Atnağulof was an active supporter of the Jaꞑalif alphabet.

In mid-1930s, Atnağulof was a lecturer in Tatar Pedagogical Institute. In 1936 Atnağulof was expelled from VKP(b) for being in touch with Trotskyite double-dealers, and arrested the next year. He was sentenced to death on August 16, 1938, by the Military Collegium of the Supreme Court of the USSR and executed the same day. Rehabilitated in 1956.

Family 
Atnağulof was married to Zöhrä Atnağulova (née Mostafina), with whom he had two daughters, Çäçkä and Gölkäy and a son, Wil, a writer; to avoid further persecution, they were forced to change their last names.

References

External links
 

Expelled members of the Communist Party of the Soviet Union
Muslims from the Russian Empire
Great Purge victims from Russia
Soviet rehabilitations
1893 births
1938 deaths